Gilia angelensis is a species of flowering plant in the phlox family known by the common name chaparral gilia. It is native to the coastal hills and mountains of California and Baja California, where it is a member of the chaparral ecosystem., especially in the Transverse Ranges.

Description
This wildflower, Gilia angelensis, grows a slender, branching stem reaching anywhere from 10 to 70 centimeters in maximum height. Leaves made up of several small leaflets grow clustered on the lower part of the plant. At the ends of the stem branches are clustered inflorescences of petite flowers. Each flower is less than a centimeter wide and very light lavender in color. The fruit is a capsule a few millimeters across containing up to 30 tiny seeds.

External links
Jepson Manual Treatment - Gilia angelensis
Gilia angelensis - Photo gallery

angelensis
Flora of California
Flora of Baja California
Natural history of the California chaparral and woodlands
Natural history of the Channel Islands of California
Natural history of the Peninsular Ranges
Natural history of the Santa Monica Mountains
Natural history of the Transverse Ranges
Flora without expected TNC conservation status